Blind Brook High School (BBHS) is a public, four-year secondary school in Rye Brook, New York, United States. It is the only public high school that serves the Blind Brook School District. BBHS is a relatively small high school; the Class of 2008 was made up of 102 students. The principal is Dr. Jennifer Chirles. The assistant principal is Mark Greenwald, a former teacher.

History

Beginnings
Blind Brook High School opened its doors in the fall of 1973. The construction of the Blind Brook School District's first high school came about after the community (which was the unincorporated area of the Town of Rye at the time) wanted to expand the local school district, District #5. This push for expansion started after the community became frustrated about spending much money to send their children to local high schools including Port Chester, Mamaroneck, Rye Neck, and Valhalla, without commensurate representation or influence on those districts' policies and programs. In addition, the Ridge Street School, which housed classes from kindergarten to 8th/9th grades, was becoming overcrowded and could not accommodate the growing population that would become known as Rye Brook (in 1982). Land was purchased on King Street, and construction was started in 1972 and ended in late 1973, months into the school year. The high school today stands on the same campus as in 1973.

1973-2003

In the fall of 1973, Blind Brook opened its doors, with David Schein as its first principal. Construction was ongoing in the new building during the first months of the school year. In fact, some classes were held while construction proceeded around them.

The original building was considered modern as it contained "open classrooms". This setup contained classrooms that had movable walls and/or book cases separating them. This made for an interesting and different learning environment since students walking in hallways would also be walking behind classes. The building was designed this way as the district chose to focus around a humanities curriculum that included interdisciplinary studies. Its faculty, a blending of teachers already working on the K-9 Ridge Street staff with new hires committed to the open-space educational concept, began an educational adventure that lasted in spirit for over 20 years.

Since the school officially opened in 1973 with Grades 7–10, Blind Brook's first graduating class was the Class of 1975, a class made up of only four advanced students, with the graduation taking place in the middle of the school year, at the conclusion of the first semester.

1997 brought the arrival of Principal Robert Chlebicki, who would hold the position until 2003. During his tenure at Blind Brook, Chlebicki helped Blind Brook move into the 21st century in many areas. In 1999, with the construction of Bellefair, a new housing development, and the influx of younger families to the community, the Blind Brook community started to outgrow the footprint of the original high school building. Further, after spending several years at the Ridge Street building, as Blind Brook grew into a 9-12 high school, the seventh and eighth grades were reintroduced back at the Blind Brook campus, adding to the crowded conditions. A parent-school district committee, called "Let's Bond for our Kids", formed a construction plan and encouraged the community to get involved and vote for funding to build a separate middle school wing. The bond passed by a large margin, bringing construction to the BB campus for the first time since 1973.

In the summer of 2000, Portables 1 and 2 were installed to create additional classroom space during the construction. These modular buildings are connected to each other, but are not connected to the main high school building. To this day, the modular classrooms, or as they are often called, the portables (though they cannot be moved), are still used for daily classes and are fairly popular among the student body.

During this time of physical change in the district, Susan Shirken, the assistant principal for the middle/high school, left to become an administrator in the Edgemont district. This marked the arrival of Michael Mitchell in 2001.

With administrative change occurring, the construction project progressed. The project ultimately resulted in a middle school wing, a middle school gymnasium, a renovated Instructional Media Center (library), new middle school and high school main offices, a 450-seat auditorium, a new front walkway and entrance, a renovated commons area, and high school classroom renovation. In addition to expansion of the building, in order to meet state fire codes, the construction also resulted in traditional, four-walled, closed classrooms. By removing wall-less classrooms, the new classroom setup left some interior rooms windowless. In addition, the Commons had its carpet removed and new, artistic walls were installed. These walls were often poked fun at and seemed very silly in the eyes of students, with statements of "This is a school, not an art museum!" pushing a backlash against the walls. Many wanted the walls removed, though that wouldn't happen until Blind Brook went through a second wave of construction. The new auditorium was also criticized as it was too small and could not fit the entire high school and its faculty in the facility at the same time. In addition, the end-of-the-year graduation would not be able to be held in the new facility as it lacked necessary seating for guests. Graduations are held in the gym as it can accommodate the larger number of guests.

2002-2003 brought much more change to Blind Brook High School. A new look, some new technology, and several new "traditions" changed the style of the culture throughout the school's new halls. A (non-merged) football team, albeit at the junior varsity level, was created, after a long absence of any type of recreational football. The team was originally made up of 25 students, and practiced at Ridge Street School.

Parking issues at the then-IBM building between the high school and the building's owners continued, resulting in tense negotiations between the two groups.

Three International Baccalaureate classes (12th grade English, 11th grade Chemistry, and Theory of Knowledge) were added  in order to create a more difficult and challenging baccalaureate curriculum, though after months of discussion and debate, the Board of Education voted 4 to 1 against the continuation of the program in March 2003.

The end of the school year also brought the resignations of Blind Brook's top administrators, long-time principal Robert Chlebicki and assistant principal Michael Mitchell, leaving a sense of uncertainty in the Blind Brook community. Chlebicki left Blind Brook for the North Shore School District on Long Island to become the Assistant Superintendent for Instruction.

2004-present
Blind Brook's administration was still up in the air in the 2003–2004 school year, as an interim principal was hired while the search for a new principal continued. Anthony Baxter and Jane Wermuth were hired for the positions of principal and assistant principal, respectively.

Blind Brook's future curriculum plans were also in limbo after the International Baccalaureate plan was rejected. A new strategy was put into action by the Board of Education to investigate the AP program and to see if it would be a good fit for BBHS. From 2004 to 2006, Blind Brook added numerous AP classes to its class offerings. In addition to new AP classes, Blind Brook, in the 2005–06 school year, also added Latin as an elective.

In early 2005, the Blind Brook community was once again outgrowing the High School building. This gave school officials no other choice than expand onto the high school building once again. A bond vote was conducted and passed by a high percentage. With this bond passed, construction returned to the Blind Brook campus for the second time in only five years.

Construction, however, did not start until late 2005, around October, because of problems with architectural plans and a slow permit approval by the New York State Education Department. In the 2005-06 phase of construction, a new middle school cafeteria, fitness center, science labs, HS and MS classrooms, and new athletic fields were built.

Problems arose when students became concerned with the future of the Rock, a tradition Blind Brook students take part in every year as the senior class paints it. The problem was fixed as the rock was moved out of harm's way.

The new fields feature synthetic grass, to give teams more flexibility in when and how often they can use they fields and.

A significant retaining wall malfunction delayed the construction of the soccer/football field, as it had to be rebuilt. The manufacturer said that the wrong type of stones had been chosen for the wall, meaning all retaining walls on the campus had to be taken down and rebuilt. This set the field projects back several months. The wall was finally completed in October 2006. The company which installed the wall and provided the stones paid for the damages. The upper field contains an artificial turf baseball field and the lower contains a six-lane track and an artificial turf lacrosse/soccer/football field. Because of the new field space, girls' lacrosse was started in 2007 at the JV level. The baseball field, complete with stands, backstop, and sliding-dirt cutouts, was completed in mid-October 2006, while the soccer/football field wasn't complete until the spring of 2007, and the track wasn't complete until July 2007.

The Village of Rye Brook, New York, at the same time, was building their fields adjacent to the BBHS campus. These fields contain a softball field and a soccer/football field.

It was announced in the spring of 2007 that Anthony Baxter would not be returning to Blind Brook for the 2007–08 school year. The Board of Education hired William Stark in June 2007 as the interim principal until a permanent replacement was found.

In the summer of 2007, Blind Brook was the site of the 2007 Empire State Games men's soccer matches, which helped further show the community the new and state-of-the-art facilities Blind Brook had to offer.

At the 2008 graduation ceremonies, the Board of Education President announced that the IMC would be renamed the Monroe E. Haas Library and IMC, in honor of the outgoing board member.

On April 16, 2008, it was announced that Scott Bersin, who had been the assistant principal at Great Neck High School North on Long Island, had been hired as the school's new principal effective July 1, 2008.
 However, Bersin only served one year of his three-year probationary appointment. At a special meeting held on Tuesday, June 2, 2009, the Board of Education accepted Bersin's resignation, making him the third principal to resign in six years.

Bersin's resignation produced a great deal of controversy, according to newspaper reports. Vincent Galasso, the former science coordinator for the middle school and high school, was appointed as an interim principal as of July 1, 2009.

On July 1, 2010, Gina Healey became the sixth principal of Blind Brook High School in seven years. When the vice principal Jane Wermuth was the only administrator not to be given a raise by Superintendent Stark, she left for the principal position at Yonkers High School.

In 2013, Blind Brook saw yet another change in staffing. After Healy's resignation, Patricia Lambert moved up from the middle school to fill the vacant position. Lambert had served as the middle school principal for two years before her promotion. Todd Richard, the vice principal, was promoted to principal of the middle school.

In 2018, high school principal Patricia Lambert became the middle school principal, and was replaced by assistant principal Derek Schuelein. Social studies teacher Mark Greenwald filled in his spot as assistant principal.

Academics
Blind Brook High School is known for its strong educational program. In 2010, U.S. News & World Report ranked Blind Brook #55 in its list of best high schools in the country, up from 85 in 2009, placing Blind Brook on its Gold Medal List for the second year in a row.

In 2008, Blind Brook, along with other high schools across the United States, asked Newsweek magazine to be left off the magazine's controversial rankings. Blind Brook signed a letter to Newsweek saying that it didn't want to be on a list that ranks high schools based on the ratio of students who take advanced-placement exams. Previously, Blind Brook had been placed 89th on Newsweek magazine's Top 100 Schools list in 2006, and 94th in 2007.

BBHS has expanded its Advanced Placement program. In 1999–2000, seven AP courses were offered. As of 2007, BBHS offered 14 AP courses in addition to high-school-level regents classes. 
BBHS was the home to a regional BOCES program for hearing impaired students. However the program concluded at the end of the 2014–2015 school year.

Extracurricular activities
Blind Brook has many activities and clubs that students can take part in during Activity Period and after school. In recent years, these clubs and teams have been recognized as top performers in their fields. Clubs range from academic teams to community groups to the arts. In 2007–08, clubs were moved from Activity Period to after-school, after formal complaints by the BBHS Congress and students. As a result of their moving, new procedures concerning clubs were established. These procedures require that both new and pre-existing clubs submit a complete list of members in order to obtain a one-year charter allowing them to operate.

Student-produced media

Blind Brook's FOCUS is a newspaper. It has won the Columbia Scholastic Press Association's gold medal. The paper is produced in-house by the students and faculty adviser.

What was first known as the Underground Literary Magazine in the early 1980s, is Blind Brook's student-produced literary magazine, Impulse. This magazine is popular for its short stories, poems, and art.

In addition to print, Blind Brook operates a cable television station through BBTV, the school's video club. This club produces original programming for the station and helps run the station.

Community service-based clubs
Blind Brook students are well known for their commitment and enthusiasm towards improving the community, and often surpass the 80 hours required to graduate. In order to expand the community service opportunities, the Blind Brook Community Service Club organizes events with senior citizen centers, holds fundraisers, and has established a pen pal program with a local elementary school. The Blind Brook Soup Kitchen is a weekly soup kitchen run by Blind Brook students since its establishment in 1998. It serves the Port Chester community by serving meals to the needy and less fortunate.  In 2001, Blind Brook's Habitat for Humanity chapter was created. The club has worked on numerous construction sites helping build homes, clean up debris, and paint churches.

Clubs for social change

The students of Blind Brook run many clubs that promote social change. These help inform the Blind Brook community of the issues facing today's world.

The AIDS Awareness Club's mission is to promote AIDS research and educate people about the topic.

SAGA, a gay-straight alliance, helps bring different groups of students together to promote acceptance, among other things.

SADD, "Students Against Destructive Decisions", is a very active club. Its goal is to help students make the right choices. Topics range from drug use to drinking and driving to social issues. The club gets its message out through guest speakers, drunk driving simulators, and bake sales.

Another popular club at Blind Brook is the Human Relations Club. It is known for its annual weekend retreat.

Language clubs
The study of foreign languages is a vital part of the Blind Brook culture. Each club uses bake sales, movie nights, and other creative means to expand the knowledge of other cultures and people.

These include BBHS Italian Club ]</ref>
Spanish Club, Latin Club, and World Languages Club (which promotes all languages other than the "big 4" listed previously).

Academic clubs
Blind Brook houses many academic clubs whichll strive to further educate students about topics of interest and expose them to different activities.

These include the Chess Club, in which students meet weekly to play chess, and JSA, in which students debate political issues.  During the presidential race, the JSA club sponsors a mock debate between the candidates.

Academic teams

Mock Trial

The Blind Brook Mock Trial team has been very successful on all levels of the New York State Mock Trial Competition, sponsored by the New York State Bar Association. The New York competition is the largest in the United States, with over 375 high schools participating each year. The Blind Brook team is usually made up of 14-16 students. Those wanting to join must go through an interview and question/response tryout. Six students are assigned lawyer positions (three for Prosecution, three for Defense) and six are given witness positions (three for Prosecution, three for defense).

The team prides itself on its competitiveness and selectivity.  The team meets every week throughout the school year for up to nine hours total, to prepare the various materials required for a trial, as well as to prepare for spontaneous situations that may come up during testimony.

The Blind Brook Mock Trial Trojans have won the Westchester County Championship nine times, in 1995, 1998, from 2004 through 2007, 2011, 2013, and 2014. Each year between 32 and 36 schools compete for the county title.

From 2004 to 2007, Blind Brook beat North Salem High School for the 2004 title, beat John Jay High School for the 2005 title, beat Harrison High School for the 2006 championship, and defeated Scarsdale High School for the 2007 title.  The team won back the Westchester champion title in 2011, beating Rye Neck High School.  The team lost in the county final round of 2012 to Rye Neck, but in their third meeting in the 2013 county finals, Blind Brook came out ahead, regaining the title of Westchester Country Champions.  In 2014, Blind Brook defended the county championship for the first time since 2007, making Westchester County Champs for the ninth time in the team's history.

Once the team captured the county title, Blind Brook moved on to the regional competition. Blind Brook is in Region IV, the Lower Hudson Valley, which is made up of Westchester, Rockland, Orange, Putnam, Sullivan, Dutchess and Ulster County. Blind Brook won the regional championship in 2005, 2006, 2007, and 2011.

In the years that Blind Brook captured the regional title, they moved onto the state level of the competition in Albany. In 2005, 2006, and 2011 the team were New York State semi-finalists. In 2007 they were runners-up, losing to the Bronx School for Law, Government, & Justice.

Math Team

The Blind Brook Math Team was one of the more popular academic teams at the school. Approximately 60 students took part in six competitions throughout the school year. In 2006 and 2007, the team finished 5th and 8th, respectively.

Model UN

The Blind Brook Model United Nations club attends several conferences throughout the school year. Blind Brook delegates have won awards at Brown University, Johns Hopkins University, and Cornell University, including Best Delegate, Outstanding Delegate, Honorable Mention, and Verbal Commendation.

Student government
The Blind Brook student government is split up into four organizations: Congress, Senate, a Shared Decision-Making Team, and class officers.

Congress
Congress is an elected body of Blind Brook High School which is composed of elected students, faculty, student-related personnel, administration, parents, and Board of Education members. Congress is responsible for policy decisions within the school. In 2011 and 2012, Congress held a school-wide Career Day.

Senate
Senate consists of 20 students, 5 from each grade with a faculty advisor, Ms.Stephanie Jacobs. They are responsible for the winter homecoming dance and other various school spirit events. Senate also sponsors other events such as an annual blood drive and the annual senior fashion  show.

Class officers
Class officers are responsible for running their grades, with the assistance of a class advisor. Freshmen and seniors have five officers and the sophomores and juniors have four.

Athletics

Blind Brook is in Section 1, Class "C" for athletics.

State championships

Soccer

1980 NY State Class "C" Boys' Soccer Champions
1978 NY State Class "C" Boys' Soccer Champions

Basketball

2004 NY State Class "C" Boys' Basketball Champions
2002 NY State Class "C" Boys' Basketball Champions

Teams

V = Varsity, VB = Varsity B, JV = Junior Varsity, F = Freshmen, Mod = Modified
N/I = need information, – = not applicable

References

External links
Official Blind Brook Schools website

Rye, New York
Public high schools in Westchester County, New York
Educational institutions established in 1973
1973 establishments in New York (state)